The Borzontul Mic is a left tributary of the river Mureș in Transylvania, Romania. It discharges into the Mureș near Joseni.

References

Rivers of Romania
Rivers of Harghita County